Gran Hermano (also known as Gran Hermano USA) is the Spanish-language adaptation of the reality television franchise Big Brother, broadcast in the United States on Telemundo and produced by Endemol. The series was announced in May 2015 during the network's upfront presentation for the 2015-16 television season in New York City.

This is the official adaptation of the international Big Brother format for Hispanic television in the U.S., making the United States in the third country worldwide, after Canada and India, to have different adaptations of the show based on language. Former Nuestra Belleza Latina host Giselle Blondet was announced as the show's presenter on December 14, 2015. The show premiered on January 10, 2016, and lasted 13 weeks.

Format 
Based on the Original Dutch Version created by Endemol, the show sees a number of different housemates, divided by gender, social backgrounds and geographical locations locked up together in a House, where the viewing public can watch them twenty-four hours a day, and vote them out of the House as they choose to. The housemates live in isolation from the outside world in a house custom built with everyday objects, like fridges and a garden. The house also includes cameras and microphones in most of the rooms to record all of the activity in the house. The confession room is the only place where housemates can be away from the other contestants, where they can confess their true feelings. The winner is the last contestant remaining in the house, and receives a cash prize of US$250,000. Housemates are evicted weekly throughout the show by the public via text messaging, cellphone calls, the show's main website, and Facebook.

Housemates

Nominations table 
The first housemate in each box was nominated for three points, the second housemate was nominated for two points, the third housemate was nominated for one point.
 This housemate was the house leader, and could not be nominated.
 This housemate was immune from eviction.  
 This housemate was evicted.
 This housemate was automatically put up for eviction by Big Brother.

Notes
: On Day 1, Carolina answered the red phone and was secretly informed that she was immune. The votes of other houseguests against her didn't count. 
: On Day 8, Jason answered the red phone and was told that he had to grant someone immunity. He picked Melissa. Melissa was also the house leader that week, effectively nullifying the immunity she had been granted, as the other houseguests couldn't vote for her anyway.
: On Day 15, Jason answered the red phone and was told he had to void someone's nominations. He chose to void Melissa's nominations. This option was later revoked because Jason did not follow the rules and told other people that Melissa's nomination votes would not count.
: On Day 22, Dante answered the red phone and was automatically nominated for eviction.
: On Day 29, Agustín answered the red phone and was given two options: he was offered $1,000 in exchange for his nomination points, or he could reject the deal but be forced to wear a carrot costume for a period of 48 hours. He chose to take the money and was not eligible to nominate.
: On Day 36, Andrea and Elizabeth entered the house as new houseguests. They were immune from nomination and eviction and were ineligible to nominate that week.
: On Day 43, Jason answered the red phone and was given the task to put on a sign over his clothes, which said that he could not talk to anyone at all and had to keep the sign in place until Wednesday's nominations. In doing so he was granted the chance to give nomination scores of 4, 3, and 2 instead of the usual scores of 3, 2, and 1. He was unsuccessful and received an automatic 4 points against him in Wednesday's nominations as a result.
: On Day 50, Rafael returned to the house as an official houseguest via a public vote against Carlos and Iselis.
: On Day 50, Rafael answered the red phone shortly after re-entering the house. He received a cake celebrating the 50-day mark of everyone's stay in the house.
: On Day 57, Jommart answered the red phone and received a phone call from home. 
: On Day 59, Pedro and Rafael agreed on nominating the remaining female houseguests, despite the fact that Big Brother had specified that 'conspiring' about nominations to rig the results was against the rules. As a result, both of them had their nominations voided, and were automatically put up for eviction along with Jommart and Maday, who had the most nominations.

Total received nominations

Awards and nominations

References

External links
Official Website

Big Brother (American TV series)
2016 American television series debuts
2016 American television series endings
2010s American reality television series
Telemundo original programming